The 1986–87 Providence Friars men's basketball team represented Providence College during the 1986–87 NCAA Division I men's basketball season. Led by second-year head coach Rick Pitino, the Friars finished the season 25–9 (10–6 Big East) and made a Cinderella run through the NCAA tournament to the Final Four.

Roster

Schedule and results

|-
!colspan=12 style=| Regular season

|-
!colspan=12 style=| Big East tournament

|-
!colspan=12 style=| NCAA Tournament

Rankings

References

Providence Friars men's basketball seasons
Providence
NCAA Division I men's basketball tournament Final Four seasons
Providence